Brahmarakshasas (Sanskrit: ब्रह्मराक्षस) are fierce demons in Hindu Itihasa.

Explanation
A Brahma Rakshasa is actually the reference to curse of Brahma, to those, who has done evil things in his life or has misused his knowledge, who has to suffer as a Brahma Rakshasa after his or her death. The earth-bound duties of such a scholar would be to disperse or impart knowledge to good students. If he did not do so, he would turn into a Brahma Rakshasa after death, which is a very fierce demonic spirit.  The word Brahma means Brahmin and Rakshasa, a demon. As per ancient Hindu texts, they are powerful demon spirits who have lot of powers, and only few in this world can fight and overcome them or give them salvation from this form of life. It would still retain its high level of learning, but developed a taste for human beings. They have the knowledge of their past lives and vedas and puranas; in other words, they have qualities of both Brahmin and Rakshasa.

In Hindu legends
It is said that the 7th century Sanskrit poet Mayurbhatta, who composed the noted Surya Sataka (one hundred verses in praise of Lord Surya) was troubled by Brahmarakshasha. He was doing penance at famous Deo Sun Temple located at Aurangabad district of Bihar. Brahmarakshas was living in the Peepal tree under which Mayurbhatta was doing penance and creating the verses. It was repeating the verses pronounced by Mayurbhatta, disturbing him. In order to defeat him Mayurbhatta started to pronounce words through nose. Since Brahmarakshasas or other spirits do not have a nose it was defeated and left the tree, which immediately turned dry. After the spirit left Mayurbhatta could peacefully create the hundred verses in praise of Surya, which cured him of leprosy.

In stories

Brahma-Rakshas were a regular feature in old Indian stories like Simhasana Dvatrimsika, Panchatantra and other old wives tales. As per these stories, Brahma-Rakshas, were powerful enough also to grant any boon, money, gold, if they became pleased with any person. In most of the stories, they are depicted as huge, mean and fierce looking having two horns on head like a Rakshas and a Choti like a Brahmin and usually found hanging upside down on a tree. Also a Brahma Rakshas would sometimes eat human beings in stories.

Temples

In many Hindu temples, especially in Central India like Maharashtra and South India like Kerala and Karnataka you can find idols of Brahm Rakshas in outer walls and are generally offered pooja, respects and an oil lamp is lit on regular basis in front of their idols. There are many temples, where they are also worshiped as demi-gods, like in Malliyor Temple of Kottayam and also in kottarathil bhagavathi KSheathramErnakulamDistrict of Kerala, it is customary to take permission from Brahma Rakshas before commencing the construction activities. Further, at Thirunakkara Shiva Temple also in Kottayam in Kerala, there is a separate temple for Brahm Rakshasa. There is an interesting story about why the Brahma Rakshas temple was built here. One person called Moose was a great friend of the king. The king was not known for his beauty but his friend Moose, was very handsome. The queen fell in love with this friend knowing which the king ordered his servants to kill Moose. Instead of killing him the king's servants killed the junior priest of the temple (keezh Santhi). The wife of the priest became a Brahma Rakshas and started troubling every body. So the king built a temple for her. For a long time afterward women did not prefer to enter this temple. Further, it is said that at Madikeri the Omkareshwar Shiva temple was built by king to ward off evil caused by Brahm-Rakshasa. At Shringeri, the Malayala Brahma Temple is of a Brahma-Raskshas. Similarly, there is separate temple for Brahma Raksha within complex of famous Kandiyoor Shiva Temple near Mavelikkara.In Njarakkal in Kerala there is an 800-year-old Bhagavathi temple where the other temples include Shiva, Nagaraja, and Sree Brahmarakshas.
 In Palakkad district of Kerala at mundakottukursi near Shornur, a Mana ( meaning the family house of the Namboodri Kerala Brahmins) called "Akathekunnath Mana" where people worship Brahmaraksha and do some vazhipadu or rites to get rid of haunting and troubles created by the spirit of Brahmaraksha. In Udupi of Karnataka, there are many temples to rid possession or troubles from a Brahmarakshasa. One such temple is Maranakatte.

In art

There are different plays like Kaisika Natakam in South India where artist play role of Brahm-Rakshas.

In Jainism

There are mentions of Brahma-Rakshas in Jainism in their scripts and stories.

In Southeast Asia
In countries like Thailand, Cambodia, and Java, whose cultures saw influence from Hinduism, there are shrines elevated on poles. These are erected in the neighborhood of every house in veneration of nature spirits. These spirits were identified in early times with Hindu deities or Sanskrit names like Brahmarakshsa, Sri Shikeshwara (Shiva), Sri Champeshwara (Krishna) and others.

In popular culture
In 2014, Vikram Bhatt made India's first 3D creature horror film entitled Creature 3D in which the creature or demon is a Brahmarakshas - a mutant from Indian mythology. However, his demon, who is a Brahma Rakshas, will not be a copy of its ancient idol in order to avoid hurting any religious sentiments. Due to this, Vikram Bhatt came up with his own imaginative take on the creature by using special effects in this film. In the film the Brahmarakshasha is depicted as a 10-feet tall animal like creature, which has a swishing tail, carnivorous teeth and nails. It is in the same league as the Yeti.

In July 2016, Zee TV announced the weekly horror based television series titled Brahmarakshasha—the story of a resurrected Satan.

References

Rakshasa
Non-human races in Hindu mythology